Backstreet Life is the third album by rap duo Totally Insane. It was released on July 25, 1995, for In-a-Minute Records and was produced by Totally Insane (Mac-10 and Ad Kapone) and the Premiere Music Group (TC, Race and Reggie Smith). The album peaked at #48 on the Top R&B/Hip-Hop Albums, which would prove to be the highest the group would make it on the charts. Backstreet Life was also Totally Insane's last album to make it to the charts and their last release for In a Minute Records.

Track listing
"Follow Me" – 4:56  
"Fast Lane" – 4:09  
"Mr. Ad Kapone (Featuring Mr. Ke-Weed)" – 4:23  
"4-Ever" – 3:21  
"Done Deal" – 4:49  
"Backstreet Life" (remix) – 4:28  
"Neighborhood Rockstarz (Featuring Money Marc, Scoot Dogg, Backstreet Mentality)" – 4:38  
"Murder, Death, Kill" – 3:34  
"Playaz and Hustlaz" – 4:17 (Featuring 11/5)  
"The 4-1-1" – 4:05  
"Total Insanity" – 4:16 (Featuring Dre Dog, Hennesy of 11/5) 
"The Band Hand Too" – 4:14  
"G-Shit (Featuring The Nut Case)" – 3:40  
"Backstreet Life" – 4:32

References

1995 albums
Totally Insane albums